The Department of Economic Development (DED) of the Emirate of Dubai is a government body entrusted to set and drive Dubai's economic agenda within the broader governance systems of the United Arab Emirates. The DED and its agencies develop economic plans and policies, identify and support strategic sectors, and provide services to domestic and international investors and businesses.

The DED was established in March 1992 and in October 2008 Sheikh Mohammed bin Rashid Al Maktoum, Ruler of Dubai, issued decree no. 25 giving the DED the responsibility to plan and regulate the overall economic performance of Dubai, supervise its functions and support the economic development to ensure the objectives of the Dubai Strategic Plan are achieved.

According to its website, "the DED supports the structural transformation of Dubai into a diversified, innovative service-based economy that aims to improve the business environment and accelerate productivity growth."

The mandate of the DED extended through four new agencies under its umbrella to include export development, retail development, entrepreneurship development and foreign investment. These sectors are the responsibility of the Dubai Export Development Corporation, Mohammed Bin Rashid Establishment for Young Business Leaders, Dubai Shopping Festival Office and the Foreign Investment Office.
 
The DED was the 2012 winner of the 'Distinguished Government Entity' in the Government of Dubai's excellence programme.

Services Offered By DED 

There are number of services offered by DED to existing business owners and budding entrepreneurs in Dubai. The online services (e-services) offered by DED on their web portal (https://eservices.dubaided.gov.ae) are:

 Instant License
 Reserve Trade Name
 Renew Trade Name
 Renew License
 Issue Initial Approval
 Issue Branch Initial Approval
 Print License
 License Activities' Terms And Conditions
 Manage License Contact
 Pay Inspection Fines
 Update Mobile Number

Legal contract related services provided are:
 
Issue Legal Contract for License
Issue Legal Contract
Approve Legal Contract
Print Legal Contract

Also, you can get answer of your enquiries related to

 Transaction Status/Payments
 Search Business Activities
 Search License Information
 Search Trade Names
 Search Sales and Promotions

References

External links

Government departments of the United Arab Emirates
Economy ministries
Economy of the United Arab Emirates